Heterocladium is a genus of mosses belonging to the family Thuidiaceae.

The species of this genus are found in Eurasia and America.

Species
As accepted by GBIF;

References

Hypnales
Moss genera